Adalbert Hrehuss (born 1906, date of death unknown) was a Romanian footballer who played as a midfielder.

International career
Adalbert Hrehuss played two matches for Romania, making his debut on 12 October 1930 under coach Constantin Rădulescu in a 5–3 loss against Bulgaria at the 1929–31 Balkan Cup. His second game was a friendly which ended with a 6–3 victory against France.

Honours
Colțea Brașov
Divizia A: 1927–28
Ripensia Timișoara
Divizia A: 1932–33, 1934–35
Cupa României: 1933–34

References

External links
 

1906 births
Year of death missing
Romanian footballers
Romania international footballers
Place of birth missing
Association football midfielders
Liga I players
Liga II players
CA Timișoara players
FC Ripensia Timișoara players